Wentletraps are small, often white, very high-spired, predatory or ectoparasitic sea snails, marine gastropod mollusks in the family Epitoniidae.

The word wentletrap originated in Dutch (wenteltrap), and it means spiral staircase. These snails are sometimes also called "staircase shells", and "ladder shells".

The family Epitoniidae belongs to the superfamily Epitonioidea. Since 2017 this family also includes the  former families Janthinidae (the pelagic purple snails) and Nystiellidae, all part of the informal group Ptenoglossa.

Epitoniidae is a rather large family, with an estimated number of species about 630.

Distribution
Wentletraps inhabit all seas and oceans worldwide, from the tropical zones to the Arctic and Antarctic zones.

Shell description
Most species of wentletrap are white, and have a porcelain-like appearance. They are notable for their intricately geometric shell architecture, and the shells of the larger species are prized by collectors.

The more or less turret-shaped shell consists of tightly-wound (sometimes loosely coiled), convex whorls, which create a high, conical spiral. Fine or microscopic spiral sculpture (also called "striae") is present in many species. The shells sometimes feature an umbilicus. Wentletrap shells have a roundish or oval  aperture, but its inner lip is often reduced to strip of callus. The round and horny  operculum is paucispiral and fits the aperture tightly. Most of the species in the family are small to minute, although some are larger, and overall the adult shell length in the family varies between 0.6 and 11.7 cm.

Within the genus Epitonium, the type genus of the family, the shell has predominantly axial sculpture of high, sharply ribbed "costae". These costae may offer some protection against other predatory snails, which would find it difficult or impossible to bore a hole in a shell with such obstructions.

Ecology
Wentletraps are usually found on sandy bottoms near sea anemones or corals, which serve as a food source for them. Some species are foragers and search for anemones.

Little is known about the biology of most wentletraps. Keen (1958) has his literature most cited.  He observed that many wentletraps reveal a hint of purple body color, suggestive of carnivorous feeding. The animal can exude through its salivary gland a pink or purplish dye that may have an anaesthetic effect on its prey.

Keen also cited direct observation of a wentletrap feeding by insertion of its proboscis into a sea anemone.

A sequence of a wentletrap feeding on an anemone has been published. These snails also prey on corals and other coelenterates.

Female wentletraps lay egg capsules that are bound together with a supple string. The young emerge from these capsules as free-swimming larvae.

Genera
Genera within the family Epitoniidae include:

 Acirsa  Mörch, 1857 
 Acrilloscala  Sacco 1891 
 Alexania Strand, 1928  
 Alora  (H. Adams, 1861) 
 Amaea H. & A. Adams, 1853 
 Boreoscala  Kobelt, 1902  (possibly a synonym of Cirsotrema)
 Cerithiscala de Boury, 1887
 Chuniscala Thiele, 1928 
 Cingulacirsa  Higo & Goto, 1993 
 Cirsotrema  Mörch, 1852 
 Claviscala  de Boury, 1909 
 Couthouyella Bartsch 1909 
 Crebriscala de Boury, 1909
 Cycloscala Dall, 1889
 Cylindriscala  de Boury, 1909 
 Depressiscala  de Boury 1909  
 Ecclesiogyra  Dall, 1892  
 Eglisia Gray, 1842 
 Epidendrium A. Gittenberger & E. Gittenberger, 2005
 Epifungium A. Gittenberger & E. Gittenberger, 2005
 Epitonium Röding, 1798 
 Eulima Risso, 1826
 Filiscala de Boury, 1911 
 Foratiscala  de Boury 1887 
 Funiscala de Boury, 1890 
 Globiscala de Boury, 1909
 Gregorioiscala Cossman, 1912 
 Gyroscala  de Boury, 1887 
 Iphitus Jeffreys, 1883
 Janthina Röding, 1798
 Kurodacirsa Masahito & Habe, 1975 
 Minabescala  Nakayama, 1994 
 Narvaliscala  Iredale, 1936 
 Opalia H. & A. Adams, 1853 
 Opaliopsis Thiele, 1928
 Periapta Bouchet & Waren, 1986 
 Plastiscala  Iredale, 1936 
 Problitora  Iredale, 1931 
 Punctiscala  Philippi, 1844 
 Recluzia Petit de la Saussaye, 1853
 Rutelliscala Kilburn, 1985
 Sthenorhytis Conrad 1862 
 Surrepifungium A. Gittenberger & E. Gittenberger, 2005
 † Turriscala de Boury, 1890 †
 Variciscala  de Boury, 1909 
 Varicopalia Kuroda MS, 1960 (nomen nudum)

Genera brought into synonymy 

 Acrilla H. Adams, 1860: synonym of Amaea H. Adams & A. Adams, 1853
 Acutiscala de Boury, 1909 : synonym of Epitonium Röding, 1798
 Amiciscala  Jousseaume 1912  : synonym of Epitonium Röding, 1798
 Asperiscala de Boury, 1909: synonym of Epitonium Röding, 1798
 Cinctiscala de Boury 1909  : synonym of Asperiscala de Boury, 1909
 Cirratiscala  de Boury, 1909  : synonym of Epitonium Röding, 1798
 Clathroscala  de  Boury 1889  : synonym of Amaea H. Adams & A. Adams, 1853
 Clathrus  Oken 1815  : synonym of Epitonium Röding, 1798
 Compressiscala Masahito (Prince) & Habe 1976 : synonym of Gregorioiscala Cossmann, 1912
 Dannevigena  Iredale 1936  : synonym of Cirsotrema Mörch, 1852
 Foliaceiscala de Boury 1912  : synonym of Epitonium Röding, 1798
 Fragiliscala  Azuma 1962  : synonym of Amaea H. Adams & A. Adams, 1853
 FragilopaliaAzuma 1972   : synonym of Amaea H. Adams & A. Adams, 1853
 Glabriscala de Boury 1909  : synonym of Epitonium Röding, 1798
 Lampropalia Kuroda & Ito, 1961  : synonym of Cylindriscala de Boury, 1909
 Mazescala  Iredale 1936  : synonym of Epitonium Röding, 1798
 Nipponoscala Masahito (Prince) & Habe 1973   : synonym of Epitonium Röding, 1798
 Nodiscala de Boury 1889 : synonym of Opalia H. Adams & A. Adams, 1853
 Nystiella Clench & Turner, 1952   : synonym of Opaliopsis Thiele, 1928
 Sagamiscala  Masahito, Kuroda & Habe, 1971 : synonym of Globiscala de Boury, 1909
 Scala Mörch, 1852 : synonym of Epitonium Röding, 1798
 Scalina Conrad, 1865  : synonym of Amaea H. Adams & A. Adams, 1853
 Spiniscala  de Boury, 1909  : synonym of Epitonium Röding, 1798
 Turbiniscala de Boury 1909  : synonym of Epitonium Röding, 1798
 Viciniscala de Boury 1909  : synonym of Epitonium Röding, 1798

References

Further reading 
A. Weil, L. Brown and B. Neville, 1999, The Wentletrap Book: A Guide to the Recent Epitoniidae of the World, Mal de Mer Enterprises
 
 Manuella Folly & Silvio Felipe & Silvio Lima, Records and Descriptions of Epitoniidae (Orthogastropoda: Epitonioidea) from the Deep Sea off Northeastern Brazil and a Checklist of Epitonium and Opalia from the Atlantic Coast of South America; International Journal of Zoology Volume 2012, Article ID 394381, 12 pages

External links

 wentletrap, Britannica
 Shell catalogue : EPITONIIDAE
 Epitoniidae, Wentletraps
 
 NC Sea Grant, Seashells of North Carolina Field Guide
 WentletrapArt, Wentletrapart International Art Residency Program
 OBIS Indo-Pacific Molluscan Database : Epitoniidae
 Miocene Gastropods and Biostratigraphy of the Kern River Area, California; United States Geological Survey Professional Paper 642